Phalonidia cermatia is a species of moth of the family Tortricidae. It is found in the Federal District of Brazil.

The wingspan is about 8.5 mm. The ground colour of the forewings is whitish, the base of the wing suffused with brownish yellow. The hindwings are whitish.

References

Moths described in 2002
Phalonidia